Verkhnyaya Zaimka is a rural locality (a selo) in Severo-Baykalsky District, Republic of Buryatia, Russia. The population was 616 as of 2010. There are 14 streets.

Geography 
Verkhnyaya Zaimka is located 53 km east of Nizhneangarsk (the district's administrative centre) by road. Kichera is the nearest rural locality.

References 

Rural localities in Severo-Baykalsky District